Jerzy Jóźwiak (18 August 1939 – 13 September 1982) was a Polish footballer. He played in one match for the Poland national football team in 1962.

References

External links
 
 

1939 births
1982 deaths
Polish footballers
Poland international footballers
Place of birth missing
Association football forwards